István Szalay (22 March 1944 – 1 September 2022) was a Hungarian mathematician and politician. A member of the Hungarian Socialist Party, he served in the National Assembly from 1998 to 2002. Prior to that, he was mayor of Szeged from 1994 to 1998.

Szalay died on 1 September 2022, at the age of 78.

References

1944 births
2022 deaths
Members of the National Assembly of Hungary (1998–2002)
Hungarian Socialist Party politicians
University of Szeged alumni
Hungarian mathematicians
People from Győr-Moson-Sopron County
Mayors of places in Hungary